G. robustus  may refer to:
 Garra robustus, an Asian freshwater ray-finned fish species
 Gerbilliscus robustus, the fringe-tailed gerbil, a rodent species found in Africa
 Gymnopilus robustus, a mushroom species

See also
 Robustus (disambiguation)